Abdel Hafiz Nofal (born July 17, 1951) is a Palestinian politician and the (Extraordinary and Plenipotentiary) Ambassador of the State of Palestine to the Russian Federation. He formerly served as the ambassador of the State of Palestine to South Africa, Namibia, and Lesotho. He also held economic ministerial positions within the public sector, overseeing commerce, industry, and labor.

Early life

Nofal was raised by a merchant family on the outskirts of Ramallah, about 30 minutes to the north of Jerusalem. He received a Bachelor of Arts (B.A.) and then a master's degree (M.A.) in International Relations while on scholarship from the University of Kyiv.

Career

Economic 

Nofal oversaw the PLO’s economic activities in the content of Africa between 1981 and 1986, while chairing the Samed Foundation. He then served as its Director of the Department of International Relations until 1994. After signing the Oslo Accords, the PLO transitioned from diasporas to the Palestinian Territories, and Nofal served as the Assistant Minister of the Ministry of National Economy until 2008, when he became the Deputy Minister of the same ministry.

Political 
In 2012, Nofal transitioned to a political role and became the Ambassador of The State of Palestine to South Africa. Nofal then was nominated and appointed by Palestinian President Mahmoud Abbas to become the Palestinian Ambassador to the Russian Federation in early 2015.

Board and Other Memberships 
Member of the Palestinian-Israeli Joint Economic Committee

Vice President of the Palestinian Administration of Capital Markets

Member of the Board of the Palestinian Investment Support Agency

Member of the Board of National Committee for Combating Money Laundering

Director of the Palestinian Standards Institute

President of Special Technical Oversight Group coordinating Palestine’s membership in the World Trade Organization (WTO)

President of the Palestinian Public-Private Partnership Committee

Personal life 
Nofal enjoys spending time with his family and hiking. He has been married for 30 years and resides with his wife in Moscow City.

See also
 List of ambassadors of the State of Palestine to South Africa

References

1951 births
Taras Shevchenko National University of Kyiv alumni
Living people
Palestinian politicians
Ambassadors of the State of Palestine to Russia
Ambassadors of the State of Palestine to South Africa
Palestinian expatriates in Ukraine